Hi Fi and the Roadburners were a rock band from Chicago whose music has been described as "rockabilly infused with punk" and "bebop and boogie-woogie".  They formed in 1984 and have had many line-up changes, with the Kish brothers, Erik and Hans, being the only constant members.  They signed with Victory Records in 1993.

Erik "Hi Fi" Kish also owned and operated Fear City Choppers with his brother Hans and Billy Favata on Chicago's Northside. Fear City Choppers' main focus is personalizing custom Harley Davidson and Triumph motorcycles. Fear City Choppers' motorcycles have been featured in the Horse Backstreet Choppers magazine.

On Thursday September 29, 2011, frontman Erik "Hi Fi" Kish died after a motorcycle accident the previous evening.

Band members
Lead vocals, rhythm guitar
 Erik "Hi-fi" Kish (died: 09-29-2011)

Bass guitar, backing vocals
 Hans Kish

Lead guitar
 Brett "Machetti" Keen
 Ed Wille
 Jeff Schuch (died: 12-28-2009)
 Randy Dell
 Bill Bulinski
 Bill Harnden ("Rockin' Billy")
 Willie Blackwell (died: 07-27-2010)
 Ron Cannon ("Big Daddy Sun") (died: 03-15-2013)
 Carl Schrieber
 Mike Berquist (died: Fall 1995)
 Jerry Nelson
 Sam Barker

Drums
 Brian Lueck
 Dan Curry
 Steve Uppling
 Randy Dell
 Daniel Aranda
 Bob Morris ("Monster Bob")
 Rick P. Fiore

Saxophone
 Tony Bryan
 Denis McQuinn
 Aaron "Gigs" Getsug
 Craig McWilliams
 "Texas" Eddie Reed (Ed Petitti)

Keyboards
 Dan Stieger
 Ken Takata
 Big Bill
 Matt

Discography

Reception
 "Chicago's Hi-Fi and the Roadburners kicked off the evening with engineer boots and pomade to spare, not to mention enough inked skin to line the walls of a tattoo parlor. Their basic guitar-and-screaming sax attack was a lunge at postwar guitar rock with all the subtlety of a lug wrench, a gruff intro for headliner Reverend Horton Heat's more polished renderings." (Chauncey Hollingsworth, Chicago Tribune, 1997)
 "Greasers with flaming tattoos and Pabst Blue Ribbon beer for cologne never go out of style, right? Well, not if they can burn the rubber with some high-test rock 'n' roll. And Chicago's Hi Fi and the Roadburners can scorch the blacktop with the best of 'em." (Michael Dunn, Tampa Tribune, 1997)
 "Hailing from Chicago, the rockabilly revival quintet Hi-Fi & the Roadburners is  members Erik Kish (vocals, rhythm guitar), Hans Kish (bass, backing vocals), Jeff Schuch (lead guitar and backing vocals), Brian Lueck (drums), and Dennis McQuinn (sax, backing vocals). The group issued several albums on the Victory label during the '90s, including such titles as 1994's Fear City, 1996's Wine, Women, and Sin, 1997's Live in Fear City, and the 1998 compilation Flat Iron Years." (Greg Prato, Allmusic)
 "The Chicagobred greased down dressed up Roadburners do plain and simple American rock 'n roll that's driven by a burning horn section." (San Antonio Express-News)
 "The Roadburners do on-the-mark, grease-fueled, American rock 'n roll. Utilizing a basic 44 backbeat and lead licks from saxophone, guitar and piano, the band delivers originals and cool covers of tunes such as "Crawfish" and "Chicken Shack Boogie"" (Jim Beal, San Antonio Express-News, 1999)

References

External links

Fear City Choppers {archive}

Punk rock groups from Illinois
Rockabilly music groups
Musical groups from Chicago
Musical groups established in 1984
Victory Records artists